The Tredegar Iron Works in Richmond, Virginia, was the biggest ironworks in the Confederacy during the American Civil War, and a significant factor in the decision to make Richmond its capital.

Tredegar supplied about half the artillery used by the Confederate States Army, as well as the iron plating for CSS Virginia, the first Confederate ironclad warship, which fought in the historic Battle of Hampton Roads in March 1862. The works avoided destruction by troops during the evacuation of the city, and continued production through the mid-20th century. Now classified as a National Historic Landmark District, the site serves as the main building of the American Civil War Museum.

The name Tredegar derives from the Welsh industrial town that supplied much of the company's early workforce.

History

Founding (1836–1841)

In 1836, a group of Richmond businessmen and industrialists led by Francis B. Deane, Jr. set about to capitalize on the growing railroad boom in the United States. The group hired Rhys Davies, then a young engineer, to construct a new facility, brought a number of his fellow iron workers from Tredegar, Wales, to construct the furnaces and rolling mills. The foundry was named in honor of the town of Tredegar, where iron works of the same name were constructed in the early 19th century. The new works opened in 1837, yet the Panic of 1837 and accompanying downturn resulted in hardship for the new company. Davies died in Richmond in September 1838 from stab wounds sustained in a fight with a workman and was buried on Belle Isle in the James River.

Management under Joseph Reid Anderson (1841 – Civil War)

In 1841, the owners turned management over to a 28-year-old civil engineer named Joseph Reid Anderson who proved to be an able manager. Anderson acquired ownership of the foundry in 1848, after two years of leasing the works, and was soon doing work for the United States government. Anderson began introducing slave labor to cut production costs. By the beginning of the Civil War in 1861, half of the 900 workers were slaves, including many in skilled positions. By 1860, Anderson's father-in-law Dr. Robert Archer had joined the business and Tredegar became a leading iron producer in the country.

The commissioning of 900 miles of railroad track in Virginia, largely financed by the Virginia Board of Public Works between 1846 and 1853, offered a further market in steam locomotives and rail stock. One of those attributed with starting the Tredegar Locomotive Works with John Souther was Zerah Colburn, the well-known locomotive engineer and journalist. The company produced about 70 steam locomotives between 1850 and 1860. From 1852 to 1854, John Souther also managed the locomotive shop at Tredegar. Its locomotive production work is sometimes listed with combinations of the names Anderson, Souther, Delaney, and Pickering. Tredegar also produced the steam propulsion plants for the USS Roanoke (1855) and the USS Colorado (1856).

Prior to the Civil War, industry expanded at the Tredegar site under Anderson's direction to include a new flour mill on land leased to Lewis D. Crenshaw and a stove works on land leased to A.J. Bowers and Asa Snyder. By 1860, Crenshaw and Co. had established the Crenshaw Woolen Mill on adjoining land they owned. This enterprise employed more than 50 people. The Crenshaw Woolen Mill became "the principal source of supply for the [Confederate] Army's requirements of uniform material" during the first half of the Civil War. A May 16, 1863 fire on the Tredegar/Crenshaw site damaged the mill, which was not rebuilt, and Tredegar purchased the land from Crenshaw and Co. by 1863.

American Civil War

By 1860, the Tredegar Iron Works was the largest of its kind in the South, a fact that played a significant role in the decision to relocate the capital of the Confederacy from Montgomery, Alabama, to Richmond in May 1861. Tredegar supplied high-quality munitions to the Confederacy during the war.

One Brook Rifle was even used as a rail-mounted siege cannon. The company also manufactured railroad steam locomotives in the same period.

As a result of his difficulties competing with Northern industries due to his higher labor and raw material costs, Anderson was a strong supporter of southern secession and became a Brigadier General in the Confederate Army as the war broke out. He was wounded at Glendale during the Seven Days Battles of the Peninsula Campaign in 1862 and served in the Ordnance Department for the duration of the Civil War.

As the war continued with more and more men conscripted into the Confederate armies, Tredegar experienced a lack of skilled laborers. Scarce supplies of metal also hurt the company's manufacturing abilities during the war, and as the conflict progressed it was noticed that Tredegar's products were beginning to lose quality as well as quantity. Even in the summer of 1861, soon after the beginning of the Civil War, metal was so scarce that the iron works failed to produce a single piece of artillery for an entire month.

During the evacuation of Richmond by the Confederates on the night of April 2–3, 1865, the retreating troops were under orders to burn munitions dumps and industrial warehouses that would have been valuable to the North. Anderson reportedly paid over 50 armed guards to protect the facility from arsonists. As a result, the Tredegar Iron Works is one of few Civil War-era buildings that survived the burning of Richmond.

After the Civil War
At the outset of hostilities, Anderson had wisely secured Tredegar assets overseas for the duration of the Civil War and, therefore, was able to restore his business when the Confederate currency collapsed. He petitioned U.S. President Andrew Johnson for a pardon for himself and Tredegar and was back in business before the end of 1865, regaining full ownership in 1867. That same year, Tredegar incorporated with a stock of $1,000,000.

Francis Thomas Glasgow, the father of Virginia writer and suffragist Ellen Glasgow, was a manager at Tredegar Iron Works, and Joseph Reid Anderson was her maternal uncle.

By 1873, Tredegar Iron Works was employing 1,200 workers and was a profitable business. However, the Panic of 1873 hit the company hard, and as a result of financing difficulties it did not transition to steel, and so faded from national prominence.

The neighborhood of Oregon Hill cropped up as a company town-like development. When Joseph Anderson died on a vacation in New Hampshire in 1892, he was succeeded by his son Colonel Archer Anderson. The Tredegar company remained in business throughout the first half of the 20th century, and supplied requirements of the armed forces of the United States during World War I and World War II. In 1957, Anderson's descendants sold the land to Ethyl Corporation, which began restoration of some of the surviving structures.

Preservation as a Civil War museum site and tourist attraction

In the 21st century, the buildings at the Tredegar site have been preserved through development of the site to commemorate the Civil War. The site is also used for various festivals and public events such as the Richmond Folk Festival.

The Pattern Building is used as the main visitors' center for Richmond National Battlefield Park. The American Civil War Center at Historic Tredegar is a separate museum at the former Tredegar Ironworks.

Valentine Riverside
In the 1990s, the Court End-based Valentine Museum opened a second museum site at the Tredegar Ironworks.  The focus of the museum experience was industrial history.  Interpretive tours to and from the site covered industrial history, African American history, and Civil War history.  The venture, however, was short-lived. The "Valentine on the James" opened on Memorial Day 1994 and closed to the public on Labor Day 1995.

Civil War Visitor Center at Tredegar Iron Works 
The Civil War Visitor Center at Tredegar Iron Works is located in the restored pattern building and offers three floors of exhibits, an interactive map table, a film about the Civil War battles around Richmond, a bookstore, and interpretive NPS rangers on site daily to provide programs and to aid visitors.

Lincoln statue 

In 2000, the former Tredegar Iron Works facility overlooking the James River near downtown Richmond became the site of the main Visitor's Center of the Richmond National Battlefield Park. Sculptor David Frech of Newburgh, New York, was commissioned by The United States Historical Society of Richmond to commemorate the historic arrival of Abraham Lincoln and his son Tad Lincoln and their tour of the burnt-out Union-captured Richmond, Virginia, April 4, 1865, 10 days before his assassination.

Funds were raised by the Historical society through donations and the selling of miniature versions of the statue as well as bronzed resin copies.  
The statue, much like the Arthur Ashe Monument, received a wide array of criticism for its placement. Traditionally reserved for statues of key figures of the Confederacy protests were held at the unveiling April 5, 2003, namely by the Sons of Confederate Veterans. Robert H. Kline, chairman of the historical society, the Richmond-based nonprofit company that commissioned the statue stated that the statue was for the purpose of reconciliation "He came on a mission of peace and reconciliation and I think the statue will serve that purpose for a very long time"

Dignitaries at the installation ceremony included former governors Douglas Wilder and Gerald L. Baliles, former Mayor of Richmond, then-Lt. Governor, and future Governor Tim Kaine, and then-Mayor of Richmond Rudy McCollum. The dedication ceremony was buzzed by a plane trailing a banner proclaiming Sic semper tyrannis, which is not only Virginia's motto (meaning "Thus always to tyrants"), but also what John Wilkes Booth, according to his diary, called out while assassinating Lincoln.

The statue is made of a bronze cast depicting Lincoln and his son Tad on a bench with Lincoln's arm around his son. The bench was deliberately made long enough so that viewers may sit next to either statue on the bench to take photographs. The words "To Bind Up The Nation's Wounds" from Lincoln's Second Inaugural Address are carved into granite behind them.

American Civil War Center at Historic Tredegar
The idea of another museum on the site was realized in 2006 when the American Civil War Center at Historic Tredegar opened to the public.  James M. McPherson described the museum as "a truly comprehensive exhibit and education center weaving together Union, Confederate, and African-American threads ... much needed for future generations to understand how the Civil War shaped the nation."  The Center contains interactive theaters, plasma-screen maps, and artifacts.  The museum's exhibits were put together by a team of historians that included James M. McPherson of Princeton, Bill Cooper of Louisiana State University, John Fleming of the Cincinnati Museum Center, Charles Dew of Williams College, David W. Blight of Yale and Emory Thomas at the University of Georgia. In November 2013 the Civil War Center was merged with the Museum of the Confederacy and became the American Civil War Museum in January 2014.

In Harry Turtledove's Southern Victory Series of alternate history novels, in which the South wins the Civil War, the Confederate Army's standard rifle is called the Tredegar, produced by what is by then called the Tredegar Steel Works.

See also
List of National Historic Landmarks in Virginia
National Register of Historic Places listings in Richmond, Virginia

References

External links

The American Civil War Center at Historic Tredegar
Teachinghistory.org Review of American Civil War Center: Educational Web Companion
National Park Service, Richmond National Battlefield Park
National Park Service, Introduction to Tredegar Iron Works
Richmond Enquirer newspaper article (28 September 1861) about the foundry
Detailed history of the foundry by B. Gardner
Confederate Railroads website
Photos
Tredegar Iron Works: Rebuilding Yankee/Rebel History Commonwealth Times April 4, 1978

Historic American Buildings Survey in Virginia
Defunct locomotive manufacturers of the United States
Rolling mills
Richmond, Virginia in the American Civil War
National Historic Landmarks in Virginia
Museums in Richmond, Virginia
History of Richmond, Virginia
American Civil War museums in Virginia
Historic American Engineering Record in Virginia
Industry museums in Virginia
Ironworks in Virginia
Industrial buildings and structures on the National Register of Historic Places in Virginia
National Register of Historic Places in Richmond, Virginia
Richmond National Battlefield Park
1841 establishments in Virginia
Historic districts on the National Register of Historic Places in Virginia
American Civil War on the National Register of Historic Places